One of the many Bismarck towers built in the former German Empire (Kaiserreich) is located in Szczecin (Gocław), now in north-western Poland (known as Stettin in German).

History 
Its construction began relatively late, in 1913, and it was only finished in 1921. The total construction cost of the -tall tower was approximately 200,000 German Papiermarks.

The tower is located on top of a small hill and is surrounded by a small wood, although the surrounding area is now generally industrial.

Although one can visit the tower, the main entry way is fully sealed off, as are all windows, making entry impossible. It is also in need of restoration.

See also 
 Szczecin-Gocław

External links 

 Bismarck towers on the official website
 Bismarck towers on Wikipedia Germany

Towers completed in 1921
Monuments and memorials in Poland
Prussian cultural sites
Bismarck towers
Buildings and structures in Szczecin
Round towers
1921 establishments in Poland